Newport Council may apply to
 Newport City Council, the city of Newport, Wales
 Newport Council of the Boy Scouts